RR Ursae Minoris, abbreviated RR UMi, is a binary star system in the northern circumpolar constellation of Ursa Minor. It can be viewed with the naked eye, typically having an apparent visual magnitude of around 4.710. The system is moving further from the Sun with a heliocentric radial velocity of +6 km/s.

This star was found to have a variable radial velocity by J. H. Moore in 1910. This gives a lower bound on the physical size of the orbit. The system is a source for X-ray and far-UV emission, with the latter most likely coming from the companion.

The visible component is an aging red giant star on the asymptotic giant branch with a stellar classification of M4.5 III. It was found to be a variable star by J. Ashbrook in 1946, and is catalogued as a semiregular variable of subtype SRb that ranges from magnitude 4.44 to 4.85 over a period of 43.3 days. However, variations in the period have been observed on a time scale of 30–60 days. The star has 1.15 times the mass of the Sun and has expanded to 60 times the Sun's radius. It is radiating 757 times the luminosity of the Sun from its enlarged photosphere at an effective temperature of 3,464 K.

References

M-type giants
Semiregular variable stars
Spectroscopic binaries
Ursa Minor (constellation)
Durchmusterung objects
132813
073199
5589
Ursae Minoris, RR